Saint-Venant is a commune in the Pas-de-Calais department (administrative division) in the Hauts-de-France region of France.

Geography

Population

Places of interest
 The church of St. Venant, rebuilt along with much of the village after the First World War.
 The Hotel de Ville (Town Hall), dating from the eighteenth century.
 The civilian cemetery, incorporating a Commonwealth War Graves Commission cemetery and the grave of Edward Gordon Williams.
 The town's war memorial.
 A memorial to the Royal Welch Fusiliers.
 Gardens of the Manoir de La Peylouse, incorporating an exhibition on First World War poetry.

See also
Communes of the Pas-de-Calais department

References

External links

 The CWGC graves in the churchyard
 The CWGC British cemetery

Saintvenant